The Department of Rural and Community Development is a department of the Government of Ireland. It is led by the Minister for Rural and Community Development.

Departmental team
The headquarters and ministerial offices of the department are on Leinster Street South, Dublin. The departmental team consists of the following:
Minister for Rural and Community Development: Heather Humphreys, TD
Minister of State for Community Development and Charities: Joe O'Brien, TD
Secretary General of the Department: Mary Hurley

Agencies
Agencies and bodies under the department:
Western Development Commission 
POBAL 
Irish Water Safety 
Charities Regulator

Schemes
Rural: Town and Village Renewal scheme, Rural Recreation Infrastructure Scheme, Rural Walks Scheme, Rural Development Fund, CLÁR, LEADER programme, Tidy Towns competition, Dormant Accounts Fund (also supporting disadvantaged urban communities).

Community: Social Inclusion and Community Programme, Community Facilities Scheme, Revitalising Areas by Planning, Investment and Development (RAPID) Programme, Libraries Investment Programme, Seniors Alert Scheme, Community and Voluntary Supports Programme, National Organisations Supports Programme, PEACE Programme.

History
The Department of Rural and Community Development was created by the Ministers and Secretaries (Amendment) Act 2017 as part of the reorganisation of governmental departments in the government of Leo Varadkar. The divisions had previously existed within the same department between 2002 and 2010 in the Department of Community, Rural and Gaeltacht Affairs.

Transfer of functions

References

External links
Department of Rural and Community Development

Rural and Community Development
Ministries established in 2017
2017 establishments in Ireland
Department of Rural and Community Development
Ireland